Noxubee may refer to:

Noxubee County, Mississippi
Noxubee River, in Alabama and Mississippi
Noxubee National Wildlife Refuge, Mississippi